Paris Theater or Theatre may refer to:

 the Paris Theatre, a former BBC radio studio in London
 the Paris Theater (Manhattan)
 the Paris Theatre (Portland, Oregon)

See also
 Théâtre de Paris
 List of theatres and entertainment venues in Paris